The Handy Writers' Colony, often called simply the Handy Colony or The Colony, was a writers' colony located in Marshall, Illinois, which operated from 1950–1964. The Handy Colony was founded in 1950 by Lowney Turner Handy and her husband, Harry Handy, along with Lowney's student (and then-lover), best-selling novelist James Jones. Lowney Handy was the Colony's quirky teacher and mentor, with financial support coming from her husband and Jones, particularly after the sale of Jones' first novel, From Here to Eternity.  A unique aspect of Handy's approach was to have her students spend many hours simply copying, by hand or typewriter, materials from authors whose work she admired.

Originally conceived as a Utopian commune where budding artists could focus exclusively on their writing projects, the colony dissolved largely in part because of Handy's own erratic behavior and Jones' focus on his own novels.

Many young writers found support at the Colony. Published writers associated with the Colony included James Jones, John Bowers, Tom T. Chamales, Edwin C. Daly, William Duhart, Jere Peacock, Jon Shirota, Jerry Tschappat (a.k.a. Gerald Tesch), and Charles S. Wright. The colony dissolved with the death of Lowney Handy in 1964.

Novels associated with the Colony 
Published novels written at least in part at the Colony or with editorial advice from Lowney Handy include:

 John Bowers:
 The Colony (New York: E. P. Dutton, 1971) — slightly fictionalized account of Bowers' time at the Colony
 Tom T. Chamales:
 Never So Few (New York: Scribner's, 1957)
 Go Naked in the World (New York: Scribner's, 1959)
 Edwin C. Daly:
 Some Must Watch (New York: Scribner's, 1956)
 A Legacy of Love (New York: Scribner's 1958)
 William Duhart: 
 The Deadly Pay-Off (Greenwich, CT: Gold Medal Books, 1958)
 James Jones:
 From Here to Eternity (New York: Scribner's, 1951)
 Some Came Running (New York: Scribner's 1958)
 Jere Peacock:
 Valhalla (New York: G. P. Putnam's Sons, 1961)
 Jon Shirota:
 Lucky Come Hawaii (New York: Bantam Books, 1965)
 Gerald Tesch:
 Never the Same Again (New York: G. P. Putnam's Sons, 1956)
 Charles Wright:
 The Messenger (New York: Farrar, Straus, 1963)

Archives 
The archives of the Handy Colony are in Archives/Special Collections in Norris L. Brookens Library at the University of Illinois Springfield. In addition, the Department of Special Collections at Cunningham Memorial Library at Indiana State University holds the Colony's library, including books by Handy's students and the books from which she had them copy.

References

External links 
Handy Writers' Colony at the James Jones Literary Society
Handy Writers' Colony Collection, 1930-1964 at the University of Illinois Springfield
Inside The Handy Writers' Colony PBS program page; premiered on PBS 2008-10-23; story text summary; video trailer available for QuickTime and Windows Media Players.
Inside The Handy Writers' Colony Official Documentary Site; Woodlawn Avenue Productions; directed by Dawn Sinclair Shapiro; access requires Flash media player.

Clark County, Illinois
Writing circles
Populated places established in 1950
1950 establishments in Illinois
1964 disestablishments in Illinois